René Vestri (25 October 1938 in Saint-Jean-Cap-Ferrat, France – 6 February 2013, in Paris) was a French politician. He was a member of the Senate of France for the Alpes-Maritimes department, a member of the General council of the Alpes-Maritimes and the mayor of Saint-Jean-Cap-Ferrat. He was a member of the Rassemblement pour la République (RPR) and of the Union for a Popular Movement (UMP).

In 2010 Vestri was indicted for money laundering, influence peddling and conspiracy. In 2011, in a separate corruption case, he received a suspended five-month prison sentence and a 3000 Euros fine.

References

1938 births
2013 deaths
Union for a Popular Movement politicians
French Senators of the Fifth Republic
Senators of Alpes-Maritimes
Mayors of places in Provence-Alpes-Côte d'Azur